Tabarijan (also Romanized as Ţabarījān and Tabrijān) is a village in Shirvan Rural District, in the Central District of Borujerd County, Lorestan Province, Iran. At the 2006 census, its population was 503, in 123 families. The village is populated by Kurds.

References 

Towns and villages in Borujerd County

Kurdish settlements in Iran